The Last Laugh is a Hardy Boys novel in the Casefiles series. It was published in 1990.

Plot 

The famous publisher of Zenith Comics, Barry Johns, is kidnapped from the San Diego comic-book convention by characters Human Dreadnought and Flame Fiend, observed by the Hardys. Joe and Frank think it was a publicity stunt, but then a kidnapper destroys a valuable art collection.

References

The Hardy Boys books
1990 American novels
1990 children's books
Novels set in San Diego